Yue Wenhai (born January 1958) is a former Chinese official, he served as Mayor of Zhoukou from  May 2012 to May 2013. He is now the Communist Party Secretary of China Minzu Securities.

Biography 
Yue Wenhai was born in Henan in 1958. In 1984, Yue Wenhai was admitted to the Henan Agricultural University, majoring in agricultural economics & management. After graduating from university in 1986, he became a civil servant. In 1995, he became the mayor of Xinzheng city. In 2012, he was transferred to Zhoukou city, as the mayor. In order to make new farmland, he launched the movement of dig graves, and he said:"It has no retreat, is a revolution, be an uphill battle." In May 2013, he resigned and became the party boss of China Minzu Securities.

Investigation 
On 1 February 2023, he was put under investigation for alleged "serious violations of laws" by the National Supervisory Commission, the highest anti-corruption agency of China.

See also 
Henan Reinterment Project

References

1958 births
Living people
Henan Agricultural University alumni
People's Republic of China politicians from Henan
Chinese Communist Party politicians from Henan